Utricularia albocaerulea is a small, probably annual, carnivorous plant that belongs to the genus Utricularia. It is endemic to Maharashtra, India and is only known from a few locations in the southwestern part of this state. U. albocaerulea grows as a terrestrial plant in damp soil and on wet rocks. It was originally described and published by Nicol Alexander Dalzell in 1851.

See also 
 List of Utricularia species

References 

albocaerulea
Flora of Maharashtra
Carnivorous plants of Asia
Taxa named by Nicol Alexander Dalzell